St John of God Hospital  may refer to:

St John of God Health Care, Australia's third largest private hospital operator
St John of God Ballarat Hospital
St John of God Bendigo Hospital
St John of God Berwick Hospital
St John of God Bunbury Hospital
St John of God Hospital Burwood
St John of God Geelong Hospital
St John of God Geraldton Hospital
St John of God Midland Public and Private Hospitals
St John of God Murdoch Hospital
St John of God Hospital Richmond
St John of God Subiaco Hospital
St John of God Warrnambool Hospital
St John of God Hospital Sierra Leone, also known as Mabessaneh Hospital

See also
 Hospital San Juan de Dios (disambiguation)